John Stocker (born August 13, 1947) is a Canadian voice actor. His career in voice acting began in the 1970s.

Life and career
In 1973, he joined a comedy troupe called the Zoo Factory, whose members consisted of Dan Hennessey, Bruce Gordon, Harriet Cohen and Jerelyn Craden.

On television, Stocker played the voice of Beastly, the clumsy and frantic, but smart villain on the Nelvana version of the Care Bears television series The Care Bears Family.

He and Zoo Factory alumnus Dan Hennessey appeared as Thomson and Thompson on The Adventures of Tintin.

In the film industry, he voiced the Cheshire Cat, as well as The Wizard's assistant Dim, in 1987's The Care Bears Adventure in Wonderland, and he played a character named Sol in 1993's Look Who's Talking Now.

He was also the voice director on Beyblade, Medabots, Committed, Pandalian, Sailor Moon, Caillou, The Amazing Spiez!, Animated Tales of the World, Rob the Robot, Totally Spies!, Totally Spies! The Movie, Plop!, Mona the Vampire, Martin Mystery, What It's Like Being Alone, The Goal, Zeroman, Strawberry Cafe, Monster Buster Club, Chuck and Friends, Papaya Bull, The Magic Hockey Skates, Zac and Penny, Fugget About It, RedaKai: Conquer the Kairu, Ella the Elephant, The Busy World of Richard Scarry, Flack, Ky Staxx, The Mulligans, Di-Gata Defenders, Mike the Knight, Dr. Dimensionpants, Timoon and the Narwhal, Nightfall, Tripping the Rift and Microfriends.

Stocker is one of the few voice actors to appear in all three of the Super Mario Bros. animated series, with one of the characters that he had voiced being Toad. He has also done voices for many video games including Jagged Alliance 2, Naruto, Hype: The Time Quest, Spawn: In the Demon's Hand, Splinter Cell: Chaos Theory, Jagged Alliance 2: Unfinished Business and Silent Storm as well as voice directing Beyblade: Super Tournament Battle, Medabots Infinity, Sentinel: Descendants in Time and Magna Carta: Tears of Blood.

He has a daughter named Bailey, who is also an actress.

Filmography

Film and television 

Let's Go Luna! (Barry)
Corn & Peg (Lulu's Grandpa)
Ewoks (Dulok Scout/Hoom/Widdle)
Star Wars: Droids (Vlix)
Today's Special (CLUMP/Crandall J. Crummington III)
My Pet Monster
Alf Tales
Babar (Basil/Zephir)
The Adventures of Tintin (Thompson)
Jayce and the Wheeled Warriors (Gun Grinner)
Super Mario Bros. (Toad, Koopa Troopa, Beezo, Mouser, Flurry, Oogtar)
Mona the Vampire (Mayor Rosenbaum)
Stunt Dawgs (Fungus)
Dog City (Bugsy)
Go, Dog. Go!
Dinosaucers (Ankylo/Terrible Dactyl)
Maxie's World (Mr. Garcia)
X-Men (Graydon Creed, Leech)
 Moville Mysteries (Mr. Silver)
Little Bear
C.O.P.S. (Sergeant PJ "Longarm" O'Malley)
Life with Judy Garland: Me and My Shadows (George Cukor)
Cyberchase (Father Time)
B.C.: A Special Christmas (Curls)
Color of Justice (Court Clerk)
The Kidnapping of the President (Herman)
Bookmice (Narrator)
The Christmas Tree
The Legend of the Christmas Tree (Lotor)
Barbie and the Rockers: Out of this World
Barbie and The Sensations: Rockin' Back to Earth
Madballs (Aargh, Skull Face)
Belphegor (Menardier)
Jacob Two-Two (Zaidy Sol/Sgt. Order)
Adventures of Sonic the Hedgehog
The Jar
The Adventures of Teddy Ruxpin (Newton Gimmick)
The Wizard of Oz (The Tin Woodman)
Blazing Dragons (Evil Knight 2/Sir Burnevere)
Hammerman (Defacely Mallmeister)
Look Who's Talking Now (Sol)
Roboroach (Toady, Skeeter Jennings)
Mischief City (Mr. Cube)
Grossology
The Care Bears Family (Beastly)
The Care Bears Adventure in Wonderland (Dim, Cheshire Cat)
Care Bears Nutcracker Suite (The Rat King)
Finders Keepers (UBS Editor)
JoJo's Circus (Federico Froggina)
Miss Spider's Sunny Patch Friends (Rocky)
Garbage Pail Kids
Ned's Newt
Franklin
Maggie and the Ferocious Beast
Ratz
The Eggs
Billy and Buddy
Flight Squad
Music Machine (Zoo Factory Member)
Mini-Man (Agent Piti/Ant King)
Kaput and Zösky (Marvin the Enchanter, The Great Ghandizen, Bobo Bibola)
Zoé Kezako (The Park Keeper)
The Secret World of Benjamin Bear (Edgar)
Ivanhoe
The Incredible Crash Dummies (Dr. Zub/Horst)
The Red Green Show (Commercial Actor)
Joy (George Miller)
Check It Out! (Morty)
Ultraforce (Stanley Leeland)
Get Ed
Diabolik
Night Hood
Bedtime Primetime Classics
Birdz
Sagwa, the Chinese Siamese Cat
Bob and Margaret
The Little Lulu Show
Rotten Ralph (Station Manager)
Kitou
My Life Me
Bronco Teddy
Moville Mysteries
The Magic School Bus
Flash Gordon
The Boy
Monster Buster Club (Bill Beattie)
The Secret World of Santa Claus
Winx Club
Funpak
Men (Delver)
Bakugan Battle Brawlers (Naga/Nova Lion/King Zenohold)
Braceface
What's with Andy?
Pearlie
Freaky Stories
Daft Planet
Atomic Betty
Corduroy
George and Martha
Elliot Moose
Tupu
Iron Nose
Pirate Family
Kid Paddle
A Miss Mallard Mystery
Patrol 03
Potatoes and Dragons
Rescue Heroes
Way Out There
ALF: The Animated Series
Martin Mystery
Medabots
Mega Babies
Flat!
Sam and Max: Freelance Police
Ali Baba
The Tradition of the Christmas Log
Monster Allergy
The Kids from Room 402
The Accuser
The Ripping Friends
Journey to the West: The Legend of the Monkey Kings
Traffix
George Shrinks
Erky Perky
Odd Job Jack
Delilah and Julius
Captain Mack
Bob and Doug
Turbo Dogs
Spider Riders
Toot and Puddle
Busytown Mysteries
Team S.O.S.
Edward
The Manly Bee
My Friend Rabbit
Pigly
The Amazing Spiez!
Iggy Arbuckle
Malo Korrigan
Silver Surfer
The Triplets
The Tofus
The Mulligans
Martin Morning
The Berenstain Bears
Pecola
Peep and the Big Wide World
Creepschool
Delta State
The Ripping Friends
Little Rosey
The Rosey and Buddy Show
Hello Kitty and Friends
Timothy Goes to School
Police Academy
Charley and Mimmo
Kit and Kaboodle
Power Stone
Slam Dunk
Gene Fusion
Monster by Mistake
Liberty's Kids
Oscar and Spike
Spaced Out
King
Milo
Metajets
What It's Like Being Alone
Anne of Green Gables: The Animated Series
Children of Chelm
X-DuckX
Blaster's Universe
Simon in the Land of Chalk Drawings
Woofy
Magi-Nation
Interlude
Wombat City
Pig City
Kevin Spencer
Prudence Gumshoe
The Adventures of Princess Sydney
Wushu Warrior
6teen
Plop!
Bratz
Spliced
Boom Unit
Giggle Factory
Snailympics
Undergrads
Wayside
3 Gold Coins
Punch
The Mysteries of Alfred Hedgehog
Uncle Joe's Cartoon Playhouse
The Triplets of Belleville
Untalkative Bunny
Fishtronaut
Henry's World
Mama Mirabelle's Home Movies
Harry and His Bucket Full of Dinosaurs
The Return of Ben Casey
Lola and Virginia
Jane and the Dragon
The Ripping Friends
Miss BG
Super Why!
The Future Is Wild
Mati and Dada
Okura
Gerald McBoing Boing
Chilly Beach
Wilbur
The Accuser
The Seventh Portal
X-Chromosome
The Wumblers
Butch Patterson: Private Dick
Bimbo
Yakari
Life on the Block
Pipi, Pupu and Rosemary
Shaolin Kids
Willa's Wild Life
Legends of the Land
The New Archies
Growing Up Creepie
Ruby Gloom
Yin Yang Yo!
Tommy and Oscar
Captain Flamingo
Franny's Feet
Gino the Chicken
Yam Roll
Keroppi
Seven Little Monsters
Seeing Things
The Soulmates: The Gift of Light
The Bellflower Bunnies
Arthur (William Carlos Williams)
Highlander: The Animated Series
Nunavut
Pet Pals
Dr. Zonk and the Zunkins
Fight for Life
Stories From My Childhood
Animal Crackers
Ripley's Believe It or Not
Quads!
For Better or For Worse
Marvin the Tap-Dancing Horse
Caillou
Dragon Hunters
Gnou
Fred's Head
The Magic Hockey Skates
Value Tales
Sailor Moon (Grandpa Hino/Mr. Magic Pierrot/Biribiri)
Knights of Zodiac
The Dumb Bunnies
Bizby
Zeroman
Scaredy Squirrel
World of Quest
Walter
Coolman
Moot Moot
This Just In
Gofrette
The Country Mouse and the City Mouse Adventures
Delilah and Julius
The Big Hit (Sid Mussberger)
SCTV (Narrator-Staff Announcer)
The Dating Guy (TV Anchor)
Katts and Dog
Franklin and Friends (Mr. Owl)
Piggsburg Pigs! (Huff)
Inuk
Di-Gata Defenders
Fred the Caveman
Clifford's Fun with...
Mike the Knight
Monster Force
Anne of Green Gables: The Movie
The Dream Team (Murray)
Beyblade (Max's Father)
Kassai and Leuk (Togum)
Lucky Luke (Tom Dalton)
Lucky Luke Goes West (Tom Dalton)
The New Adventures of Lucky Luke (Various characters including General Custer and Joe Dalton)
Ocean Tales (Walrus, Basil)
Sylvanian Families (Grandpa Smoky Wildwood/Gatorpossum)
King of Kensington (Paul)
Strange Days at Blake Holsey High (The Furnace)
Madeline (Vendor)
Tripping the Rift
Tripping the Rift: The Movie
Wunschpunsch
My Dad the Rock Star
My Goldfish is Evil
Artopia
Time Warp Trio (Kai's Uncle/Brawny Accomplice)
Mia and Me (Polytheus)
Rupert
Mythic Warriors: Guardians of the Legend (Zetes, Polemius, 2nd Soldier/2nd Guard)
Redwall (Brother Alf/Cheese Thief/Clogg)
Totally Spies! (Seth/Bedhead)
Totally Spies! The Movie
Avengers: United They Stand (Ultron)
Tom and Vicky (Grandad)
Hangin' In (Fat Voice)
Faireez (Higgledy)
Bad Dog (Grandpa)
Carl Squared (Doc Wilson)
Mica (Gabbro)
Hot Shots (Cromwell)
Dex Hamilton: Alien Entomologist (Regis Stone)
Dex Hamilton: Fire and Ice (Baxter)
Exhibit A: Secrets of Forensic Science (Pavel Klimko)
Concrete Angels (Mr. Stock)
Metastax
Spike Christmas
The Three Pigs
Hippo Tub Company
Something from Nothing (Papa Mouse/Papa/Itzik/Teacher)
Hoze Houndz
Meet Julie
Little Shop
Jim Button
Pippi Longstocking
Ace Ventura: Pet Detective
Pelswick
Dog's World
Ella the Elephant
Chuck and Friends
Flying Rhino Junior High
Free Willy
Anatole (Pamplemousse)
The Busy World of Richard Scarry (Father Cat/Mr. Humperdink/Scotty Dog/Pedro/Wolfgang Wolf)
Donkey Kong Country (Kutlass)
The Neverending Story (Gluckuck)
Beetlejuice (Mr. Monitor/Bartholomew Batt)
Starcom: The U.S. Space Force
Rob the Robot (Mission Control)
Cadillacs and Dinosaurs (Dr. Fessenden)
Coming Up Rosie (Dwayne Kramer)
The Real Ghostbusters (Stay Puft Marshmallow Man)
Turtle Island
Sidekick (Mayor Swifty)
Tales from the Cryptkeeper (Melvin, Various Monsters)
Friends and Heroes (Nathan)
Higglytown Heroes (Nacho Brother Nick/Additional Voices)

Video games
Bakugan Battle Brawlers (Naga)
Spawn: In the Demon's Hand (Clown)

References

External links

John Stocker management profile at Claire Boivin Agency
Sailor Moon article mentioning John Stocker

1947 births
20th-century Canadian male actors
21st-century Canadian male actors
Canadian male video game actors
Canadian male voice actors
Canadian casting directors
Canadian voice directors
Living people
People from Clarington